Escher Wyss & Cie., also known as Escher Wyss AG, was a Swiss industrial company with a focus on engineering and turbine construction. Its headquarters were in the Zürich quarter of Escher Wyss, which takes its name from the company.

History
The company was founded, as Escher Wyss & Cie., in 1805 by Hans Caspar Escher and Salomon von Wyss. After having originally started the company as a textile spinning business, the two expanded their enterprise to include a machine shop that manufactured textile machinery, water wheels, water turbines, power transmission equipment, and starting in 1835, ships, including boilers and steam engines.

After 1860, under the direction of Hans Zoelly, the company concentrated on hydraulic systems, steam engines and cooling systems. Between 1904 and 1929 steam turbines were produced for thermal power plants, ships and locomotives. The company also manufactured the hydraulic systems of hydroelectric plants. During WWII, the company was a supplier for the German war effort, manufacturing turbines for Norsk Hydro, and supplying flamethrowers. Additionally, the company was an integral part of researching and developing turbines to produce heavy water for the creation of nuclear weapons for the Nazis.  The company remained in existence until it was taken over in 1969 by Sulzer AG, now inside of the group Andritz AG.

Notable products 
 A design of naphtha launches (1890)
 The twin Lake Zürich paddle steamers Stadt Zürich (1909) and Stadt Rapperswil (1914) built for the Dampfbootgesellschaft, both listed in the Swiss inventory of cultural property of national and regional significance as Class A objects.
 Two Lake Lucerne paddle steamers Unterwalden and Gallia (1902/1913)
 Propellers for the Hispano Aviación HA-1112

See also
 Barsanti-Matteucci engine

References

Engineering companies of Switzerland
Companies based in Zürich
Manufacturing companies established in 1805
Manufacturing companies disestablished in 1969
1969 disestablishments in Switzerland
Swiss companies established in 1805